Obergeis is a village in the municipality of Neuenstein, district Hersfeld-Rotenburg in the German State of Hesse.

Villages in Hesse